Macrauzata fenestraria is a moth in the family Drepanidae first described by Frederic Moore in 1868. It is found in Taiwan, India and China.

The wingspan is 45–52 mm. Adults are on wing in May.

Subspecies
Macrauzata fenestraria fenestraria
Macrauzata fenestraria insulata Inoue, 1988 (Taiwan)

References

Moths described in 1868
Drepaninae